Markel Bergara Larrañaga (born 5 May 1986) is a Spanish former professional footballer who played as a defensive midfielder.

He spent the better part of his career with Real Sociedad, appearing in 212 competitive matches and scoring four goals. In La Liga, he also represented Getafe.

Club career

Real Sociedad
Bergara was born in Elgoibar, Gipuzkoa. A Real Sociedad youth graduate, he started his professional career on loan, having season-long spells in the Segunda División with SD Eibar and UD Vecindario, both ended in relegation.

On 4 September 2007, Bergara made his first-team debut, appearing in a 1–0 away defeat against UD Las Palmas in the second round of the Copa del Rey. He only played four times in the league in his first year, also in the second tier.

Bergara appeared in 19 games in 2009–10 as the Basques returned to La Liga after a three-year absence, as champions. He made his debut in the competition on 13 September 2010, in a 2–2 away draw against UD Almería (three minutes played). He finished the campaign with exactly the same number of appearances as the club retained its league status, albeit in 491 more minutes of play.

In 2012–13, Bergara contributed 28 matches as Real finished fourth and returned to the UEFA Champions League after more than a decade. He scored his first goal as a professional on 24 March 2014, but in a 4–3 loss at Almería.

Bergara missed the vast majority of the 2016–17 season, due to an ankle injury.

Getafe
On 18 July 2017, Bergara was loaned to fellow top-flight side Getafe CF for one year. He managed to score four times in his first 14 appearances, but in December he suffered another serious physical ailment, this time in the knee.

Bergara signed a permanent contract on 27 June 2018. In January 2020, not being able to overcome his injury problems, he announced his retirement at the age of 33.

Honours
Real Sociedad
Segunda División: 2009–10

Spain U19
UEFA European Under-19 Championship: 2004

References

External links
Real Sociedad official profile 

1986 births
Living people
People from Elgoibar
Spanish footballers
Footballers from the Basque Country (autonomous community)
Association football midfielders
La Liga players
Segunda División players
Segunda División B players
Real Sociedad B footballers
Real Sociedad footballers
SD Eibar footballers
UD Vecindario players
Getafe CF footballers
Spain youth international footballers
Basque Country international footballers